is a Japanese footballer who plays for Matsumoto Yamaga FC in the J3 League. He plays as a centre-forward and has previously had spells with Yokohama F. Marinos, FC Tokyo, Vissel Kobe and Gamba Osaka.

His older brother Daigo Watanabe was also a professional soccer player with Kyoto Sanga FC, Omiya Ardija, Busan IPark and Kamatamare Sanuki.

Club career
Watanabe made his J-League debut for Yokohama F. Marinos against Sanfrecce Hiroshima on 7 March 2009 and scored his first league goal. He kept up his scoring exploits throughout the 2009 season and finished with 13 league goals which broke the previous record for a rookie player set by Shoji Jo in 1994. This earned him the young player of the year award 2009. During his next two seasons in Yokohama, he did not quite hit the heights of his debut year, but he did go on to amass a respectable 15 goals in 54 league games across 2010 and 2011.

Watanabe was transferred to FC Tokyo ahead of the 2012 season and in total he spent 3 seasons in Japan's capital. 2013 was a highlight for him as he bagged 17 goals in 33 league games to help the men in blue and red finish in eighth place in the final standings. However, his other two seasons with Tokyo were rather forgettable, he scored six times in 27 league games during his first year at the Ajinomoto Stadium in 2012 before finishing off his career in the capital by netting just three times in 26 league appearances.

This loss of form in 2014 saw him shipped off to join Vissel Kobe ahead of the 2015 campaign. The move west seemed to do him good as he was immediately back into double figures in terms of goals scored, ending the 2015 season with 10 goals in 28 league appearances. The following year was even better for him personally as he scored 12 goals in 33 league games, which helped Kobe to an impressive seventh-place finish in the overall standings in 2016. That would prove to be the pinnacle of his career in the port city as he followed it up with eight goals in 34 league games in 2017 before netting just four times in 19 games in the first half of the 2018 season.

Watanabe joined Gamba Osaka in August 2018 in a deal which saw Gamba forward Shun Nagasawa move in the opposite direction. He made a scoring debut for the men in blue and black with a 27th-minute strike to break the deadlock in a league match away to Vegalta Sendai. Unfortunately for him and his team-mates his goal was not enough as Sendai fought back in the second half to finish as 2–1 winners. He ended the season with three goals in 12 league appearances to help Gamba to a ninth-place finish in the final league table.

In 2021 he joined Yokohama FC on a free transfer.

International career
Watanabe made his full, senior international debut for Japan on 6 January 2010 in a 2011 AFC Asian Cup qualifier against Yemen. He started the match and was replaced in the 85th minute by Kensuke Nagai as Japan came from two goals down to run out 3–2 winners.

Career statistics

Club
Updated as of match played on 22 April 2021.

1Includes Japanese Super Cup.

International

Honours

Individual
 J.League Rookie of the Year : 2009

References

External links
 
 Japan National Football Team Database
 
 Profile at Yokohama F. Marinos 
 Profile at Yokohama FC 

1986 births
Living people
Waseda University alumni
Association football people from Nagasaki Prefecture
Japanese footballers
Japan international footballers
J1 League players
J2 League players
J3 League players
Yokohama F. Marinos players
FC Tokyo players
Vissel Kobe players
Gamba Osaka players
Yokohama FC players
Matsumoto Yamaga FC players
Association football forwards